Progress MS-12, Russian production No.442, identified by NASA as Progress 73P, was a Progress spaceflight operated by Roscosmos to resupply the International Space Station (ISS). This was the 164th flight of a Progress spacecraft.

History 
The Progress-MS is an uncrewed freighter based on the Progress-M featuring improved avionics. This improved variant first launched on 21 December 2015. It has the following improvements:

 New external compartment that enables it to deploy satellites. Each compartment can hold up to four launch containers. First time installed on Progress MS-03.
 Enhanced redundancy thanks to the addition of a backup system of electrical motors for the docking and sealing mechanism.
 Improved Micrometeoroid (MMOD) protection with additional panels in the cargo compartment.
 Luch Russian relay satellites link capabilities enable telemetry and control even when not in direct view of ground radio stations.
 GNSS autonomous navigation enables real time determination of the status vector and orbital parameters dispensing with the need of ground station orbit determination.
 Real time relative navigation thanks to direct radio data exchange capabilities with the space station.
 New digital radio that enables enhanced TV camera view for the docking operations.
 The Ukrainian Chezara Kvant-V on board radio system and antenna/feeder system has been replaced with a Unified Command Telemetry System (UCTS).
 Replacement of the Kurs A with Kurs NA digital system.

Pre-launch 
In 2014, the launch was planned for 1 July 2018, rescheduled for 5 June 2019 and rescheduled to 31 July 2019. The liftoff had been initially set for the two-day rendezvous profile with the station, but the launch time was later shifted to enable a two-orbit (three-hour) flight to the station.

Launch 
Progress MS-12 was launched on 31 July 2019, at 12:10:46 UTC from Baikonur Cosmodrome in Kazakhstan, using a Soyuz-2.1a rocket.

Docking
Progress MS-12 docked with the Pirs docking module. The docking took place 3 hours 18 minutes 31 seconds into the mission (a new record time).

Cargo 
The Progress MS-12 spacecraft delivered  of dry cargo (in the cargo compartment).
  of water (in the Rodnik-system tanks)
  of oxygen (in pressurized bottles)
  of propellant in the refueling section
  of propellant in the integrated propulsion system to the International Space Station.

The dry cargo consisted of:
  of hardware for onboard systems
  of medical supplies
  of personal protective gear
  of hygiene items
  of repairs and servicing equipment
  of means of crew support
  of food
  of payloads
  of structural components and other hardware
  of NASA cargo.

Undocking and decay 
The Progress MS-12 craft undocked from ISS on 29 November 2019 at 10:25 UTC, initiated braking maneuver at 13:39 UTC, re-entered Earth's atmosphere at 14:11 UTC (end of mission), with any remaining debris impacting a remote part of Pacific Ocean at 14:19 UTC.

See also 
 Uncrewed spaceflights to the International Space Station

References 

Progress (spacecraft) missions
Spacecraft launched in 2019
2019 in Russia
Supply vehicles for the International Space Station
Spacecraft launched by Soyuz-2 rockets
Spacecraft which reentered in 2019